Kelburn Castle is a large house near Fairlie, North Ayrshire, Scotland. It is the seat of the Earl of Glasgow. Originally built in the thirteenth century (the original keep forms the core of the house) it was remodelled in the sixteenth century. In 1700 the first Earl made further extensions to the house in a manner not unlike a French château which is virtually how it appears today. In 1977 the house and grounds opened to the public as a country park.  It is one of the oldest castles in Scotland and has been continuously inhabited by the same family for longer than any other. The castle is protected as a category A listed building, while the grounds are included in the Inventory of Gardens and Designed Landscapes in Scotland.

When it was found in 2007 that the castle's concrete facing would soon need replacing, Lord Glasgow invited four Brazilian graffiti artists to decorate the walls. This was still in place in 2011, when the Earl sought permission from Historic Scotland to keep the graffiti permanently.

History

The Boyle family have been in possession of the lands of Kelburn since the 12th century.

The castle is thought to have been built in the 13th century and, although no one knows the exact date of the first stone laid, the castle was there during the Battle of Largs, which was fought between the Scots and the Norwegians in 1263.

The first structure was a wood tower. This wooden tower was replaced in the 1200s with a stone Norman Keep, sections of which are still in use today.

In the late 16th century a tower house was built. This replaced an earlier structure, and may incorporate parts of the earlier masonry its eastern part. In the 17th century, orchards and gardens are recorded at Kelburn. David Boyle (1666–1733), a member of the Parliament of Scotland, was created Earl of Glasgow in 1703. He began the new north-west wing of the house, which was completed circa 1722. The 1st Earl doubled the size of the building by adding a William-and-Mary style mansion house onto the Castle at a slight angle, built to the Earl’s instructions by the well-known mason, Thomson Caldwell.

George Boyle, 6th Earl of Glasgow (1825–1890), added the north-east wing in 1880.

The 7th Earl of Glasgow, who was made Governor of New Zealand in 1892, provides the links between the Kelburn Estate and Kelburn in New Zealand. Many of his souvenirs still reside at the castle, and in the Estate’s Museum.

Following the opening of the grounds to the public, the estate buildings and stables were converted in 1980, to provide a tea room, shop and visitor information.

Graffiti project
In 2007 experts told the owners of Kelburn Castle that its concrete facing would eventually need to be replaced to avoid further damage to the stonework. At the suggestion of his children, Lord Glasgow invited four Brazilian graffiti artists (Nunca, Nina and Os Gêmeos twins) to paint the walls. Historic Scotland agreed to the project, on the basis that the graffiti would be removed when the castle was re-harled. The project was featured on the BBC television programme The Culture Show. Also in 2007, Kelburn featured in another BBC programme, Crisis at the Castle which documented the financial problems of running the castle.

In September 2010 it was reported that Historic Scotland were putting pressure on Lord Glasgow to remove the graffiti, although this was later denied by both parties. In August 2011 it was reported that the Earl had formally written to Historic Scotland asking permission to keep the graffiti as a permanent feature.

Fire damage
The castle suffered minor fire damage on 16 February 2009, as a result of an electrical fault. The fire service was called to a blaze at around 1:45 am where flames had engulfed a top-floor room and spread to the roof. Around 25 firefighters battled the blaze for more than five hours before it was extinguished at around 7:20 am.

Kelburn Country Centre

The 10th Earl of Glasgow, Patrick Boyle, and his family still reside at the castle. It was his decision to open the estate to the public in 1977, transforming the grounds and outhouses into play areas, a café, gift shop, etc, and also allowing access to the castle for tours.

The grounds are open daily 10am - 6pm from Easter to October, with shorter hours through the winter.

There are three outdoor play areas including the Secret Forest, which is a fairy tale trail through the woodland. There's also the Wild Wild West Saloon and the Adventure Course.

Events

Kelburn is popular for its imaginative events calendar. Numerous family friendly events run throughout the year, offering outdoor, interactive, and creative fun. The team also host a scarily fun Halloween event, recommended for over 16s.

The Estate becomes home to the 6000 capacity music festival, The Kelburn Garden Party each year in July. "The Kelburn Garden Party is a music and arts festival that explodes across numerous stages, nooks and spaces throughout the magical glen and stunning gardens that surround Kelburn Castle on Scotland's West Coast. We pack as much music, performance, art and entertainment as we can into this unique environment, with surreal and magical results. It's a cultural safari for the mind, body and soul."

The estate is available for weddings, with 5 licensed spots for exchanging vows plus 2 reception venues. The Functions Team also organise corporate events and parties.

Glamping and Camping
There are 8 yurts available for hire at Kelburn. Sat on the hillside campsite, the accommodation offers views over the Firth of the Clyde and its islands. A glass fronted facilities block offers toilet, shower and kitchen facilities, plus seating.

There are also bell tents available, and the ability to bring your own tent or camper van.

The Kel Burn

The Kel burn has helped form the glen over thousands of years. In the space of just over half a mile, it rises on the moors over 800 feet above the castle and drops dramatically, by way of many waterfalls and gorges, to the sea. The glen is a wealth of wild flowers and ferns, shrubs and trees. Walks up the glen reveal views across Largs, the Firth of Clyde and over to Arran.

References

External links

 Official site

Castles in North Ayrshire
Country houses in North Ayrshire
Category A listed buildings in North Ayrshire
Listed castles in Scotland
Country parks in Scotland
Inventory of Gardens and Designed Landscapes
Gardens in North Ayrshire
Parks in North Ayrshire
Graffiti in the United Kingdom
Clan Boyle